Chicago Jazz was a synchronized skating team from Rolling Meadows, IL, a northwest suburb of Chicago.

The Chicago Jazz began in 1987, as the Jazz Babies under the direction of Coach Lisa Darken. With a team of 22 skaters, the Jazz Babies began their climb in 1991 and became the U.S. Figure Skating Bronze Medalists in the Intermediate Division at the U.S. National Precision Skating Championships held in Anchorage, Alaska. The team continued to grow and in 1994 earned entry for all four divisions with a total of 80 skaters in the U.S. Figure Skating National Precision Team Championships in Providence, Rhode Island. Every year from 1994 to 2019, the Chicago Jazz was represented in the U.S. National Championships.  

In 1996, the Jazz Babies merged their precision skating program with the Rolling Meadows Rockettes Precision Ice Skating Club. This new family of over 160 Skaters, representing 8 divisions, became known as the Chicago Jazz Precision Ice Skating Club. Utilizing skating facilities in Rolling Meadows, Park Ridge, Buffalo Grove, and Glenview, Chicago Jazz represented the Chicago area both nationally and internationally.

In 2006, Head coach Lisa Darken was awarded the PSA Synchronized Skating Coach of the year award.

Notable achievements 

Chicago jazz were six-time Junior U.S. national champions, three-time Junior U.S national silver-medalists, three-time Novice U.S. national champions, five-time Juvenile U.S. national champions, and earned a third-place finish at the junior world challenge cup during the 2006–07 season.

Skater achievements 
Several Chicago Jazz skaters have been nominated to the USFSA Scholastic Honors Team, which recognizes high school-age U.S. Figure Skating members who have distinguished themselves in figure skating, academics, and community involvement.

 2002 Kara Dollaske, Awardee 
 2002 Charity Witlock, runner up
 2010 Alexa Kommich, Awardee
 2012 Jordan Barone, Awardee 
 2013 Jacquelyn Cruz, Awardee

Competitive highlights 
The Chicago Jazz representative teams competed Internationally as members of Team USA starting in 1998, continuing through the 2018-19 season

2007-08 to 2018-19 seasons

1998-99 to 2006-07 seasons

References

External links

Chicago Jazz Home Page
Chicago Jazz Instagram

Junior synchronized skating teams